Pietro Ruisi (born 6 January 1955 in Palermo) is a retired Italian footballer and manager. He played as a midfielder. He played one match in Serie A for Palermo on 20 May 1973 against Ternana. 
In 1986, he began his career as a manager. His coaching style was influenced by Zdenek Zeman. During his career he managed many squads including Messina, Taranto, Gela and Bitonto.

Career
1972-1973  Palermo 1 (0)
1973-1974  Pro Vasto 0 (0)

Career as a manager
1986-1990  Licata (Assistant)
1990-1991  Messina Primavera
1992-1993  Messina
1994-1995  Civitanovese
1995-1997  Taranto
1997-1999  Messina
1999-2000  Trapani
2000-2001  Matera
2001-2003  Gela
2004-2006  Bitonto
2006-2007 Genzano
2007-2008  Matera
2008-2009  Bitonto
2010-      Francavilla Calcio

External links
 http://www.pianetarosanero.com/pianeta2009/lista-campionati-335.html
 http://www.calciodieccellenza.it/phpBB3/viewtopic.php?p=56389&sid=c83914b03d359a50e16794e5bc52f5d8

1955 births
Living people
Italian footballers
Association football midfielders
Italian football managers